Oxfordshire in South East England has an area of 2,605 square kilometres and a population of 648,700. 
In England, the body responsible for designating Sites of Special Scientific Interest (SSSIs) is Natural England, which is responsible for protecting England's natural environment. Notification as an SSSI gives legal protection to the best sites for wildlife and geology. As of 2020, there are 111 SSSIs in Oxfordshire, 78 of which have been designated for biological interest, 27 for geological interest, and 6 for both biological and geological interest.

Key

Interest
B = site of biological interest
G = site of geological interest

Public access
FP = access to footpaths through the site only
No = no public access to site
PP = public access to part of site
Yes = public access to all or most of the site

Other designations and wildlife trust management
BBOWT = Berkshire, Buckinghamshire and Oxfordshire Wildlife Trust
GCR = Geological Conservation Review site
LNR = Local nature reserve
NCR = Nature Conservation Review site
NNR = National nature reserve
Ramsar = Ramsar site, an internationally important wetland site
SAC = Special Area of Conservation
SM = Scheduled monument
SPA = Special Protection Area

Sites

See also
Berkshire, Buckinghamshire and Oxfordshire Wildlife Trust
List of local nature reserves in Oxfordshire

Notes

References

Sources

 
Oxfordshire
Sites of Special Scientific Interest